The 2003 Bergen International Film Festival was arranged in Bergen, Norway 16–21 October 2003, and was the fourth edition of the festival.

Competitive programs

Cinema Extraordinare

 A Good Lawyer's Wife, directed by Im Sang-soo 
 Any Way the Wind Blows, directed by Tom Barman 
 Blind Shaft, directed by Li Yang 
 Chinese Odyssey 2002, directed by Jeffrey Lau 
 Dark Cities, directed by Fernando Sariñana 
 Facing Windows, directed by Ferzan Özpetek 
 Falling Angels, directed by Scott Smith 
 Kakuto, directed by Yūsuke Iseya 
 Love Me If You Dare, directed by Yann Samuell 
 Personal Velocity: Three Portraits, directed by Rebecca Miller 
 Pornografia, directed by Jan Jakub Kolski 
 Song for a Raggy Boy, directed by Aisling Walsh 
 The Longing, directed by Iain Dilthey 
 Travellers and Magicians, directed by Khyentse Norbu 
 Tycoon: A New Russian, directed by Pavel Lungin

Non-competitive programs

International Short Film Program

3 Short Films from Stavanger
 Taperaksje, directed by Stian Kristiansen
 Hål i hjerta, directed by Vigdis Nielsen
 Sjokoladesaus, directed Jørgen Tjernsland

Awards

Cinema Extraordinare
 Blind Shaft, directed by Li Yang

The Audience Award
 Kill Bill Vol. 1, directed by Quentin Tarantino

Best Norwegian Short Film

 Fear Less, directed by Therese Jacobsen

The Critic's Award
Only time awarded.

 A Good Lawyer's Wife, directed by Im Sang-soo

External links
Official site

2003 in Norway
Bergen International Film Festival
B
B

no:Bergen internasjonale filmfestival